Nita Mukesh Ambani (née Dalal, born 1 November 1963) is an Indian philanthropist. She is the chairperson and founder of the Reliance Foundation, Dhirubhai Ambani International School and a director of Reliance Industries. She is married to Reliance Industries chairman and managing director Mukesh Ambani. With a family fortune estimated in excess of US$83.4 billion (February 2023), the Ambanis are among the richest in the world. She is also an art collector and owner of the Indian Premier League cricket team Mumbai Indians.

She was listed in 2016 in 'the fifty high and mighty Indians' list by India Today. and in 'the most influential women business leaders in Asia' list by Forbes. She was the first Indian woman to become a member of the International Olympic Committee (IOC).

Nita Ambani is the co-chair of Mumbai Academy of the Moving Image.

Early life 
Nita Ambani (née Dalal) was born on 1 November 1963 in a middle-class Gujarati family in Mumbai to Ravindrabhai Dalal and Purnima Dalal. She completed her bachelor's degree in Commerce from Narsee Monjee College of Commerce and Economics, and took up Bharatnatyam from an early age and grew to become a professional Bharatanatyam dancer.

Career 
Nita Mukesh Ambani is the founder and chairperson of Reliance Foundation, the corporate social responsibility arm of Reliance Industries.

She is also the owner of Mumbai Indians. In 2014 she was elected to the board of Reliance Industries. Ambani is also an art collector.

Jamnagar Township Project 
In 1997, Mrs Ambani was involved in the project of building a company township for the employees of Reliance’s refinery at Jamnagar. The project involved establishing a tree-lined and environmentally-friendly colony to house more than 17,000 residents. Today, the Jamnagar complex has an orchard with nearly 100,000 mango trees that is also home to a variety of birds.

Reliance Foundation 

Reliance Foundation is an Indian philanthropic initiative founded in 2010 by Nita Ambani. Reliance Industries is a patron of the organization.

Mumbai Indians 
Ambani is the co-owner of Indian Premier League (IPL) team, Mumbai Indians which won the title in 2013, 2015, 2017, 2019 and 2020. She led the ‘Education and sports for All’ (ESA) initiative as part of Mumbai Indians' way of giving back to society. ESA has reached over 100,000 underprivileged children and created awareness for education using various media and digital platforms.

Dhirubhai Ambani International School 
Ambani is the founder of the Dhirubhai Ambani International School which has been ranked among the best schools in Resources & Services

IOC membership 
On 4 June 2016, Ambani was among eight candidates nominated for membership in the International Olympic Committee (IOC) by the Swiss-based panel. The election of these new members was held during the 129th IOC Session in the first week of August 2016. Ambani was elected as a member of the IOC on 4 August 2016, its first Indian woman member.

Jio World Centre 
Reliance Industries on 4 March 2022 announced the opening of the first phase of the Jio World Centre in Mumbai’s Bandra Kurla Complex.

Her Circle 

Her Circle is a digital platform for women complete with its own discussion panels and social networking app.Reliance Foundation’s Nita Mukesh Ambani has launched ‘Her Circle’ on the occasion of International Women’s Day, March 8, 2022. The new initiative aims to fuel women empowerment with modern, digital tools. Launching for Indian women but extending its service to all women overseas, Her Circle will provide the ladies a "joyful and safe space for interaction, engagement, collaboration, and mutual support." "When women lean on women, incredible things happen," Ambani said at the launch. "Whether it is the women from Reliance Foundation or the national and international women leaders that I have worked with, our shared experiences show me that in the end our struggles and triumphs resonate with each other," she adds. Her Circle is in the major languages of English and Hindi.

Nita Mukesh Ambani Cultural Centre (NMACC) 
Nita Mukesh Ambani Cultural Centre (NMACC) is housed within the Jio World Centre in Mumbai’s Bandra-Kurla Complex (BKC) and will emerge the most sought-after venue to showcase best of India’s art and culture to the world.Nita Ambani called it a truly inclusive centre for performers and visitors, as well as for dreamers and creators, which aims to make the arts accessible to everyone with world-class infrastructure. 

The four-storeyed NMACC will contain 16000 sq feet of purpose-built exhibition space and three theatres. The largest of these, a 2,000-seat Grand Theatre, will include an extraordinary and unique lotus-themed chandelier with 8,400 Swarovski crystals.

A trio of dedicated spaces for the performing arts include The Grand Theatre, The Studio Theatre and The Cube, all built with cutting-edge technology to cater to a wide range of experiences, from intimate screenings and stimulating conversations to multilingual programming and international productions. The centre will also launch the Art House, a four storeyed space to spotlight leading Indian and international artists.

Personal life 

Nita Ambani was born as Nita Dalal to Ravindrabhai Dalal and Purnima Dalal. She has a sister, Mamta Dalal, who works as a school teacher. Mamta is known to teach Sachin Tendulkar and Shahrukh Khan's children. Dalal-Ambani grew up in a middle-class environment in suburban Mumbai. She is a trained Bharatnatyam dancer. She met Mukesh Ambani when she was a school teacher and married him in 1985. After marriage, she worked as a teacher for a few years. Nita lives in the skyscraper private building, Antilia which is also the second most luxurious and expensive house.

They have two sons and a daughter. Akash Ambani and Isha Piramal (née Ambani) are the elder children and Anant Ambani is younger. The elder twins Isha Piramal and Akash Ambani were born via IVF, after seven years of Nita and Mukesh's marriage. When she was pregnant with Anant, who she conceived naturally three years after the twins, it was her pregnancy weight which started to take a toll on her. Akash Ambani, who graduated in economics from Brown University, is now chief of strategy at Reliance Jio Infocomm. Isha Piramal, a graduate in psychology from Yale University, is now a director at Reliance Jio Infocomm and Reliance Retail. Isha is married to Anand Piramal, the Executive Director of the Piramal Groups. Isha Piramal's brother, Akash Ambani is married to Shloka Ambani (née Mehta). Nita Ambani is the grandmother of Prithvi Ambani, who is the son of Akash Ambani and Shloka Mehta.

Awards 
For her initiatives on grassroot sports, Ambani received the 'Rashtriya Khel Protsahan Award 2017' from the President of India.
She is the recipient of the award for Best Corporate Supporter of Indian Sports, given by the Times of India.

See also 
 Mukesh Ambani
 Anil Ambani
 Tina Munim Ambani
 Dhirubhai Ambani
 Antilia

References

External links 

 Reliance Foundation website

Indian women philanthropists
20th-century Indian philanthropists
1963 births
Living people
Nita
International Olympic Committee members
Reliance Industries people
20th-century women philanthropists
Indian art collectors
Women art collectors